Into the Hot may refer to:

 Into the Hot (Gil Evans album), 1962
 Into the Hot (Floy Joy album), 1984